Lise Michaëla Meehan  Ward (born 17 December 1970) is a Danish sailor. She competed at the 1996 Summer Olympics, the 2000 Summer Olympics, and the 2004 Summer Olympics.

She holds a Master of Science in Economics and Business Administration from the Copenhagen Business School and now resides in New Zealand.

References

External links
 
 

1970 births
Living people
Danish female sailors (sport)
Olympic sailors of Denmark
Sailors at the 1996 Summer Olympics – 470
Sailors at the 2000 Summer Olympics – 470
Sailors at the 2004 Summer Olympics – 470
Place of birth missing (living people)